BAPTA (1,2-bis(o-aminophenoxy)ethane-N,N,N′,N′-tetraacetic acid) is a calcium-specific aminopolycarboxylic acid. The presence of four carboxylic acid functional groups makes possible the binding of two calcium ions. The extensive flexibility of the carboxylate ligands is critical to the coordination of calcium and other metal ions. Due to its properties, it is used in research to chelate Ca2+, similarly to EGTA and EDTA. 

There is a range of reported values for the dissociation constant of BAPTA, though 0.2 μM appears consistently. The rate constant for calcium binding is 500 μM−1 s−1.

See also 
 EDTA
 EGTA
 Fura-2

References

Anilines
Carboxylic acids
Chelating agents
Phenol ethers
Glycol ethers